Events in the year 1890 in Iceland.

Incumbents 

 Monarch: Christian IX
 Minister for Iceland: Johannes Nellemann

Events 

 Staðarbakkakirkja church is constructed in Miðfjörður.

References 

 
1890s in Iceland
Years of the 19th century in Iceland
Iceland
Iceland